Discestra is a genus of moths of the family Noctuidae. It is considered a synonym of Anarta and is likely invalid.

References

Natural History Museum Lepidoptera genus database

Hadeninae